Malva is a 1924 German silent film directed by Robert Dinesen and starring Lya De Putti, Hans Adalbert Schlettow and Ernst Rückert.

Cast
 Lya De Putti as Malva  
 Hans Adalbert Schlettow as Tadzio  
 Ernst Rückert as Tassilo  
 Erich Kaiser-Titz as Gregori  
 Tronier Funder as Bosco

References

Bibliography
 Bock, Hans-Michael & Bergfelder, Tim. The Concise CineGraph. Encyclopedia of German Cinema. Berghahn Books, 2009.

External links

1924 films
Films of the Weimar Republic
Films directed by Robert Dinesen
German silent feature films
German black-and-white films
Phoebus Film films